The European School, Mol was the third of the thirteen European Schools to be established, and is one of five such schools in Belgium. Founded in 1960, it is located in Mol, in the province of Antwerp.

The school was primarily established to provide an education to the children of staff posted to nearby domestic, and European atomic research projects and facilities; the Belgian governments' nuclear research centre, the Organisation for Economic Co-operation and Development's Eurochemic nuclear fuel reprocessing plant (now defunct), and the European Atomic Energy Community's Central Bureau for Nuclear Measurements (now under the auspices of the European Commission as the Institute for Reference Materials and Measurements).

However, the school has also welcomed children from other European or overseas families who live and work in the area. Buses bring pupils from as far as Antwerp and Eindhoven, with nearby facilities to accommodate boarders during the school week.

Nursery School
Children can go to kindergarten from the age of 3. There they are already looked after in the respective language sections by German, English, French or Dutch speaking teachers.
The daily routine is comparable to that in a regular nursery. The only difference is that the children meet children of many other nationalities at a very young age.

Primary School
In primary school, all children are taught their mother tongue, mathematics, history, geography, science, art, music, Catholic or Protestant religion or ethics and sports. Except for art, music, sport and ethics, all subjects are taught in the mother tongue. In the other subjects, classes are mixed from the different language sections. These subjects are taught either in the local language, here Flemish, or sometimes in English for better understanding. From the first year of primary school, the children learn their first foreign language, which is called a second language within the European Schools. They can choose between German, English and French. The choice of the second language is very important, because from the 3rd secondary class (after the 5th primary class and the subsequent transfer to the Gymnasium, counting starts again at 1) Community Studies and then from the 4th secondary class Geography and History are taught separately in the second language. During so-called European Hours, the children of all classes engage in various activities

Secondary school

Lower School (1 to 3)
The first three years of secondary school are seen as an "observation stage". 
Pupils should be introduced to as wide a range of subjects as possible, to promote general knowledge and to help them decide on the right subjects in later years. 
The following subjects are taught: Language 1 (mother tongue), Language 2, Language 3, Latin (optional subject), Mathematics, Social Studies, Science, ICT (Computer Science), Art, Music, Physical Education, Religion or Ethics and additional activities.

Free periods must be spent either in the library or in the "Stüdie", where students can study, read, work or lounge quietly by themselves. This does not apply to free periods before or after lunch, where you can go out to eat, nor to free periods in the last lesson. 
When the students have one or more free periods in a row at the beginning or end of the school day, and they live near the school, they may also go home.

Middle School (4 and 5)
In the Middle School, pupils have a maximum of 31 to 35 lessons per week. The compulsory subjects account for 27 to 29 lessons (depending on the mathematics lessons).

Compulsory subjects: Language 1, Language 2, Language 3, Religion/Ethics, Physical Education, History, Geography, Physics, Chemistry, Biology,

Elective subject: Mathematics (weak 4 hrs/week; strong 6 hrs/week)

Electives: Language 4, Latin, Economics, ICT (Information Technology), Art, Music.

From grade 5 onwards, the grading changes. In grades 1-4, the so-called A grade consists of homework and cooperation in class, and the B grade consists of tests written in class. 
The report mark is calculated 50:50 from the A and B marks. 
From the 5th grade onwards, the tests written in class are added to the A grade, while the B grade is calculated from two mid-year exams. 
The weighting is 50:50, with 50 per cent of the grade consisting of only two exams.

Upper School (6 and 7)
Compulsory subjects: Language 1, Language 2, Sport, Religion/Ethics
Electives: Mathematics (weak: 3 hrs/week; strong 5 hrs/week; advanced: 8 hrs/week), Philosophy (compulsory 2 hrs/week; optional 4 hrs/week), History (compulsory 2 hrs/week; optional 4 hrs/week), Geography (compulsory 2 hrs/week; optional 4 hrs/week), Science (compulsory 2 hrs/week; optional Physics and/or Chemistry and/or Biology 4 hrs/week each).
Electives: Latin, Economics, Language 3, Language 4, Art, Music, Language 1 Advanced, Language 2 Advanced
Complementary subjects: art, music, language 5, ICT (computer science), laboratory science, economics.

The European Baccalaureate is taken at the end of the seventh year of secondary school. This is valid throughout the EU, Switzerland and the USA, without any "foreigners' exams", as a university entrance qualification and must be recognised.

Sections and Languajes
The European School has three language sections:

 Dutch language section
 English language section
 French language section

The spoken language corresponds to the language of the section. 
During breaks, lunch time, joint activities, etc. children hear other languages as well. This early language exposure will greatly benefit them in learning other languages at a later age.

SWALS 
(students without a language section) also follow courses in their mother tongue for 150 minutes per week

In seconday, from Year 1 onwards, all Secondary School students study 3 languages:
 Language 1 or mother tongue: Dutch, English, French or German (main language of the student’s language section or mother tongue; conditions apply)
 Language 2 (first foreign language): English, French or German
 Language 3 (second foreign language): Spanish, Italian, German, Dutch, French, English or any other European language
 Languages 1 and 2 are taught by native speakers (or equivalent).
Students can study a 4th language as of Year 4 and a 5th language as of Year 6.
Most of the courses are instructed in the language of the language section. Art, music and physical education are instructed in English.

Services
School Restaurant
The school restaurant, managed by an external partner, provides a daily menu (hot meal), sandwiches, soup and salads. 
Students use their multifunctional digital badge which can be topped up by parents to purchase meals and drinks from the restaurant. 
For Nursery pupils, the hot lunch from the canteen is served in a dining area in the Nursery School.

Medical service
The medical service organizes general medical examinations for pupils in Nursery (3–5 years), Primary 1 and 5 and Secondary 2 and 4. 
This service monitors the vaccinations and administers them (after permission from the parents) according to the basic schedule of the Flemish Government.
The school nurse is available during school hours to provide medical assistance.

Transportation
Daily school buses from Antwerp and Eindhoven are organised by our Parents’ Association.

 Line E: Eindhoven (NL)  – Veldhoven – Eersel – ES Mol
 Line AC: Kalmthout – Ekeren/Donk – ‘s Gravenwezel – Schilde – Ranst – Zoersel -Turnhout – ES Mol
 Line B: Edegem – Wilrijk/Edegem – Wilrijk – ES Mol
 Line D: Antwerp – Borgerhout – ES Mol

Friday lunch bus: stops: Edegem – Wilrijk/Edegem – Wilrijk – Borgerhout – ES Mol

Public transportation is available from both Mol and Geel train station.

Boarding school
The school work closely with an external boarding school, which organises transport to and from school. 
Students can stay in the boarding house from Monday to Friday.

After-school Care Centre
The Parents’ Association organises and runs the After-school Care Centre (Garderie) on the school campus. 
The Garderie is open every school day and offers various optional activities on Monday and Friday afternoons. 
After-school Care is primarily intended for Nursery and Primary School pupils.

Creche (0–3 years)
Located on our campus, the ‘Kleine Wereld’ creche is open to all children between the age of 0 and 3.

24-hour security
An external security company provides 24-hour surveillance of the school campus. 
Parents can request a car sticker to enter for drop-off and pick-up of their child(ren). 
Visitors are not permitted to enter our premises without prior notice or an invitation.

ICT
In order to establish a digital learning environment for the students, the school integrate digital resources and programmes in the curriculum as much as possible.
Primary and Secondary School pupils receive a computer login so they can develop their digital skills during ICT lessons.
Secondary School students also receive a personal Office 365 account. 
The school uses SMS. an online school management platform, to communicate with students and parents.

Facilities
Green campus
With more than 20-hectare campus nestles in a forest at the heart of rural Flanders, students can enjoy the vast outdoor spaces and learn to appreciate spending time in nature.

Gym
The 3 indoor sports halls are equipped with a multipurpose sports floor to practise indoor sports such as gymnastics, basketball, volleyball,...

Sports fields (Secondary)
Being able to practise sports outdoors in a natural setting is one of the many perks of being an ES Mol student. Track and field, football and tennis are just a few of the many sports that feature during weekly sports lessons.

Swimming pool
From Nursery School all the way through Secondary School, students follow a comprehensive learning-to-swim programme in the 25-metre indoor swimming pool on campus. Students who take extra sports can participate in scuba diving classes.

Play forest (Primary + Nursery)
The campus comprises a secure play forest. 
Weather-permitting, Primary pupils spend their lunch break in the play forest three times a week. 
Occasionally, our Nursery pupils also explore the forest with their teachers.

Libraries
The students learn to love books in our two fully equipped libraries. 
They can borrow books and take them home. 
Primary School pupils visit the library with their teachers and learn how to find fiction and non-fiction books. 
The Secondary students use the library to study, research and complete school work. 
The libraries comprise books in various European languages and at different reading levels.

Domus (Secondary)
Situated near the Secondary School building, the multifunctional ‘Domus’ is used for Parents’ information evenings, conferences, exams, meetings, workshops, etc. 
The Domus also offers a space for Year 6 and 7 students to relax and study independently

Buildings and grounds
When you drive through the gate with barriers, you pass a log cabin with a guard on the right. The barriers, the guard, the student ID cards and the windscreen stickers were introduced after 11 September 2001 for the safety of the students. Behind the log cabin is the caretaker's bungalow. If you now drive straight ahead, you will come directly to the kindergarten. Behind the kindergarten is a playground. Behind this playground, in turn, are 6 tennis courts of the secondary school. To the left of the tennis courts is the gym for the kindergarten and primary school. Attached to this is the swimming pool with an Olympic pool with 4 lanes. To the left of the kindergarten is the primary school with 2 large courtyards for playing during the short break after third period. Behind the primary school is a playground in the forest and also basketball, volleyball and football courts. To the right of the kindergarten are the 2 sports halls for the secondary school. Behind the sports halls are volleyball courts, a jumping pit, basketball courts and a concrete football pitch. Further to the left is a grass football pitch with a surrounding cinder track, as well as 2 further jumping pits. Furthermore, there is also an ash football pitch there. Between the secondary school sports halls and the cinder pitch is an administration bungalow and the teachers' and visitors' car park. In front of the sports halls, towards the exit, is the canteen with auditorium. Next to the canteen and the administration building, the 4-storey secondary school building rises in the shape of an angular eight.
In addition to the many sports facilities, the school has laboratory rooms, a darkroom, a soundproof music room, a library with over 15,000 books, a computer room and 2 art rooms. The school grounds have been extensively renovated in recent years.

See also 
European School
European Schools

References

External links 
 

Educational institutions established in 1960
Mol
International schools in Belgium
Secondary schools in Belgium
1960 establishments in Belgium
Buildings and structures in Antwerp Province
Organisations based in Antwerp Province
Mol, Belgium